The following are the national records in athletics in Mozambique maintained by Mozambique's national athletics federation: Federação Moçambicana de Atletismo (FMA).

Outdoor

Key to tables:

h = hand timing

A = affected by altitude

a = aided road course according to IAAF rule 260.28

Men

Women

Indoor

Men

Women

Notes

References

External links

Mozambique
Records
Athletics